Volksraad (5 February 1988 – 28 December 2011) was a thoroughbred horse and a New Zealand sire of champion racehorses. He dominated the New Zealand sires lists, with six consecutive titles from 2001 to 2007.

His progeny include:
 Bahnhof Zoo 
 Clifton Prince 
 Dantelah 
 Dezigna
 Distill
 Fiscal Madness 
 Katana
 Military Move, the 2010 New Zealand Derby winner  
 One Under 
 Sir Slick, six-time Group 1 winner 
 Star Satire
 Thriller 
 Torlesse, winner of the 2003 New Zealand Cup
 Tusker, the 2005 Championship Stakes and 2006 Awapuni Gold Cup winner. 
 Veloce Bella 
 Vinaka
 Volkaire 
 Willy Smith 
 Zola

Volksraad was euthanased after fracturing a shoulder in a paddock accident on 28 December 2011. He was 23 years old.

See also

Thoroughbred racing in New Zealand

References

1988 racehorse births
2011 racehorse deaths
New Zealand Thoroughbred sires
Racehorses bred in the United Kingdom
Champion Thoroughbred Sires of New Zealand
Thoroughbred family 10-c